Kassina maculosa is a species of frog in the family Hyperoliidae. It is found in Cameroon, Central African Republic, and northern Democratic Republic of the Congo, and possibly also in northern Republic of the Congo. Its natural habitats are lowland secondary forests and savanna, and montane forests and grasslands. It tolerates habitat modification and is also found in farm bush. Breeding takes place in standing water, possibly also in streams at high altitudes.

References

maculosa
Frogs of Africa
Amphibians of Cameroon
Amphibians of the Central African Republic
Amphibians of the Democratic Republic of the Congo
Taxa named by Richard Sternfeld
Amphibians described in 1917
Taxonomy articles created by Polbot